FMF may refer to:

Arts 
 Fantastic Mr Fox, a novel by Roald Dahl
 Fantastic Mr. Fox (film)
 Fantastic Mr. Fox (opera)
 Fender Music Foundation, an American children's charity
 Firefly Music Festival, in Dover, Delaware, United States
 Florida Music Festival, in Orlando, Florida, United States

Sport 
 Malagasy Football Federation
 Malian Football Federation
 Mexican Football Federation
 Moldovan Football Federation
 Mozambican Football Federation

Other uses 
 Familial Mediterranean fever
 Fees Must Fall, a South African student protest 
 Feminist Majority Foundation, an American rights organization
 Fleet Marine Force, of the United States Navy and United States Marine Corps
 Flying Machine Factory, a motocross aftermarket supplier
 Find My Friends, iOS software
 First Millennial Foundation, now the Living Universe Foundation, a pro-space colonisation group
 Front mid-engine, front-wheel-drive layout, a vehicle drivetrain layout
 Funkmaster Flex (born 1967), American hip hop DJ
 United States Foreign Military Financing, a program of the United States federal government